Aureliano in Palmira is an operatic dramma serio in two acts written by Gioachino Rossini to an Italian libretto in which the librettist was credited only by the initials "G. F. R." The libretto has generally been attributed to Felice Romani, but sometimes to the otherwise unknown Gian Francesco Romanelli. It has been suggested that the latter name may have resulted from a confusion of Romani with Luigi Romanelli, La Scala's house poet prior to Romani's appointment to the post.

The story was based on the libretto by Gaetano Sertor for Pasquale Anfossi's 1789 opera Zenobia in Palmira and it centers on the rivalry between the Roman Emperor Aurelian and Prince Arsace of Persia over the beautiful Zenobia, Queen of Palmyra.

The act 1 duet between Zenobia and Arsace, "Se tu m'ami, o mia regina" (If you love me, oh my queen), was greatly admired by Stendhal. Although he had never seen a complete performance of Aureliano in Palmira, he heard the duet in a concert in Paris and described its music as "sublime" and one of the best duets that Rossini had written. Other music from this opera, particularly the overture, was later reused by Rossini in Elisabetta, regina d'Inghilterra and in The Barber of Seville.

It premiered at La Scala in Milan on 26 December 1813.

Performance history
19th century

Aureliano in Palmira was Rossini's second commission from La Scala. It opened the theatre's Carnival season with the famed castrato, Giovanni Battista Velluti as Arsace. It was the only role that Rossini wrote for the castrato voice. Rossini had originally written the role of Aureliano for Giovanni David, one of the most renowned tenors of the day. However, throat problems during rehearsals led David to withdraw from the production, and Luigi Mari took his place. The popular soprano, Lorenza Correa, sang the role of Queen Zenobia. The orchestra at the premiere was conducted by Alessandro Rolla, with the staging directed by Alessandro Sanquirico.

The opera's opening night proved disappointing to the Milanese critics who praised the production but considered the music inferior to that of Rossini's Tancredi which had premiered in Venice earlier that year. There was also criticism of the three principal singers. Nevertheless, it had a run of 14 performances at La Scala that season and was performed sporadically in various Italian theatres (including the Teatro di San Carlo in Naples) between 1814 and 1831. It was also performed in London in 1826, again with Velluti as Arsace. The opera then fell more or less into obscurity.

20th century and beyond

There was another major revival in 1996 at the Rossini in Wildbad Festival conducted by Francesco Corti, with Donald George as Aureliano, Angelo Manzotti as Arsace, and Tatiana Korovina as Zenobia. It was performed again in 2011 in Martina Franca and was given a new production at the Rossini Opera Festival in Pesaro in August 2014. The Pesaro production, conducted by Will Crutchfield and directed by Mario Martone, was the first performance of the critical edition of the opera, which Crutchfield prepared.

Roles

Synopsis

Place: in and around the city of Palmyra
Time: 271–272 A.D.

Act 1 
Queen Zenobia, her lover Arsace, and the priests offer sacrifices in the Temple of Isis and pray for their deliverance from the approaching Roman army. General Oraspe enters to the strains of martial music and announces that Aureliano's Roman army is at the gates of Palmyra. Arsace pledges his Persian troops to defend the city. After a dramatic battle scene on the plains outside the city, the Persians are defeated. The Roman soldiers celebrate their victory. Aureliano arrives and addresses Arsace, now a prisoner. He responds to the Emperor with dignity and affirms his love for Zenobia, saying that he is prepared to die for her.

Inside Palmyra's walls, Zenobia has hidden the kingdom's treasures in the vaults beneath the palace. She decides to make a last stand with her troops to save the city. She asks Aureliano for a truce so that she can speak with him and obtain the liberty of the prisoners, including Arsace. On Aureliano's refusal to free the prisoners, she asks to at least see Arsace for a last time. Zenobia and Arsace weep over their fate. Aureliano enters and promises to free Arsace on condition that he abandons Zenobia. Arsace refuses and is sentenced to death. The Roman and Palmyran armies prepare for a last battle.

Act 2 

Palmyra has now been conquered by the Romans. Aureliano enters Zenobia's palace and offers his love to her, which she refuses. Meanwhile, Oraspe frees Arsace who then flees to the hills by the Euphrates river where he is sheltered by a group of shepherds. Arsace's soldiers join him and tell him that Zenobia has been taken prisoner. Arsace sets off to free her and launch a new attack against the Romans with the Palmyran troops.

In the palace, Aureliano proposes to Zenobia that they reign together over Palmyra. Once again Zenobia refuses. Later that night, Arsace and Zenobia meet again in the moonlight and embrace. When they are discovered by the Roman troops, they ask to die. Although he secretly admires their courage and devotion to each other, Aureliano decrees that they will end their days in separate cells. Publia, the daughter of Roman general and secretly in love with Arsace, begs Aureliano to take pity on him.

The final scene takes place in a large chamber of Zenobia's palace. The leaders and priests of the defeated Palmyrans are gathered in supplication before Aureliano. Oraspe, Arsace and Zenobia are led into the chamber in chains. Aureliano, has a change of heart and frees Zenobia and Arsace to reign together over Palmyra provided they both swear fealty to the Roman Empire. This they do, and praise Aureliano for his generous heart. The chorus sings joyfully, "Torni sereno a splendere all'Asia afflitta il dì" (May the day dawn serene and shining for suffering Asia).

Recordings

Notes and references 
Notes

Citations

Sources

 
 
 
 
 
 . Reprint (1987): New York: Limelight. .

Further reading

 Beghelli, Marco; Gallino, Nicola, editors (1991). Tutti i libretti di Rossini. Milan: Garzanti. .
 Beghelli, Marco; Smith, Candace, translator (1996). "The Opera of Misunderstandings", p. 10 in the booklet accompanying the Bongiovanni recording, catalog no. GB 2201/2-2.
 Gossett, Philip; Brauner, Patricia, "Aureliano in Palmira" in Holden, Amanda (ed.), The New Penguin Opera Guide, New York: Penguin Putnam, 2001. 
 Kaufman, Tom (1999). "A Performance History of Aureliano in Palmira", The Opera Quarterly, vol. 15 (1), pp. 33–37, Oxford University Press. .
 {{cite encyclopedia|last=Osborne|first=Richard|title=Aureliano in Palmira|editor=Stanley Sadie|editor-link=Stanley Sadie|encyclopedia=The New Grove Dictionary of Opera|volume=1|location=London|publisher=MacMillan Publishers|year=1998|isbn=1-56159-228-5|ref=none}}
 Scarton, Cesare; Tosti-Croce, Mauro (2001). "Aureliano in Palmira: Un percorso storico-drammaturgico da François Hédelin d'Aubignac a Felice Romani" (in Italian). Bollettino del centro rossiniano di studi'', vol. 41, pp. 83–165. .

External links
 
 
 , published in Milan by Giacomo Pirola

Operas by Gioachino Rossini
Italian-language operas
1813 operas
Operas
Operas set in the Levant
Opera world premieres at La Scala
Libretti by Felice Romani
Cultural depictions of Aurelian